is the stage name of , an award-winning Japanese popular singer who was prolific between 1967 and 1980. She won numerous awards as a singer and composer, branching into acting. After a surgery to remove polyps on her vocal cords in 1985, she became a business woman. Since 1993, she has worked in the field of animal welfare and has published several books about animal care. She has periodically returned to television in guest appearances and in 2010 resumed singing and composing.

Early life
Sagara was born in 1945  in Tokyo. She suffered from severe shyness from childhood, but had a love for music. Raised in a wealthy family, her grandfather is the major shareholder of Tomoe Industries, she began music training with jazz singer  at the age of sixteen. She enrolled in Nihon University College of Arts to study television direction and originally wanted to produce music programming for Fuji TV. While she was in university, she continued singing at such venues as Nikko Music Salon mainly to gain an understanding of the performer's perspective. When she graduated in 1967, Fuji was not interested in hiring a woman producer, but she was approached by a scout from The Japan Victor Company who was looking for new singing talent.

Career
Sagara debuted as a singer with the song The World for Two People, which won her the Best New Artists Prize at the 9th Japan Record Awards in 1967 and sold 1.2 million copies. She became known for her distinctive style and had many hits throughout the country. In 1969, she won the grand prize for If It Is Happy, If It Is Sad at the 11th Japan Record Awards, presented by the Japan Composer's Association for best new record and performer. The win marked the first time the top honors had gone to a woman. Beginning in 1967, Sagara was invited to sing at the Year-end Song Festival, known as "Kōhaku", hosted by the Japan Broadcasting Corporation. For thirteen consecutive years, she participated and placed in the finals for the competition five times. In 1972, she won the annual singing battle and repeated her win in 1974 and 1976.

Her music career led Sagara into acting, as she composed the theme song for the television drama Arigatou (Thank you), which aired from 1970 to 1974. She was a featured actress in the final season of the program. In 1977, the mayor of Hiroshima, the Chamber of Commerce, and executives of the Hiroshima Bank organized a festival underwritten by the Chugoku Shimbun and RCC Broadcasting in honor of the resilience of the citizens in surviving the bombing and celebrating peace and the joy of living. Sagara was selected as the featured singer for the inaugural Hiroshima Flower Festival, and sang the theme song, Hanaguruma.

In 1980, a woman claiming to be Sagara's former partner outed her as a lesbian on TV Asahi's Afternoon Show, causing the collapse of her career. Sagara denied the alleged affair and the woman retracted her statement, but the damage was done, as invitations to the premier award shows disappeared. She did continue to work in music for a few years, releasing a single YASUKOの場合 (Yasuko case) in 1983 and then a jazz album to honor her former teacher Mizushima in 1986. After completing the album, Sagara lost interest in her music career. The following year, she had surgery to remove polyps on her vocal cords. She was told that after the surgery she would be unable to sing for a year. Sagara took a 9 to 5 job in her family business.

Wanting to work with animals, Sagara began a company, Animal Fanciers's Club, in 1993, in Nasushiobara in the Tochigi Prefecture. Her focus is on rescuing dogs and cats and improving animal welfare. At the facility, she trains dogs and does outreach, inviting internationally known lecturers to educate the public about proper care of animals. Since 2003, she has published books dealing with animal care. In 2010, after two decades away from the music industry, Sagara released an album, いのちの木陰 (Shades of Life). After hearing the song, she was selected in 2011 to compose and sing the theme song for the TBS series Izakaya Henji.

Selected books

Awarded Songs

References

Citations

Bibliography 

1945 births
20th-century Japanese actresses
20th-century Japanese composers
20th-century Japanese women writers
21st-century Japanese actresses
21st-century Japanese composers
21st-century Japanese women writers
Animal welfare workers
Japanese businesspeople
Japanese women composers
Japanese women singers
Living people
Nihon University alumni
Businesspeople from Tokyo
20th-century women composers
21st-century women composers